Rao Arrondissement is an arrondissement of the Saint-Louis Department in the Saint-Louis Region of Senegal. It is the area around Saint-Louis city.

Subdivisions 
The arrondissement is divided administratively into rural communities and in turn into villages.

Arrondissements of Senegal
Saint-Louis Region